Terry Williams (born 1968), is a male former athlete who competed for England.

Athletics career
Williams represented England in the 100 and 200 metres and won a bronze medal in the 4 x 100 metres event, at the 1994 Commonwealth Games in Victoria, British Columbia, Canada.

References

1968 births
Living people
English male sprinters
Commonwealth Games medallists in athletics
Commonwealth Games bronze medallists for England
Athletes (track and field) at the 1994 Commonwealth Games
Medallists at the 1994 Commonwealth Games